is a fictional character and the playable protagonist of the video game series Metroid by Nintendo. She was created by Japanese video game designer Makoto Kano. She was introduced as a player character in the original 1986 video game Metroid. Samus Aran is an ex-soldier of the Galactic Federation who became a galactic bounty hunter, usually fitted with a powered exoskeleton that is equipped with weapons such as directed-energy weapons and missiles. Throughout the series, she executes missions given to her by the Galactic Federation and the Chozo while hunting the antagonistic Space Pirates and their leader Ridley, along with the parasitic energy-draining organisms called Metroids and the manipulative cybernetic supercomputer Mother Brain.

Samus is the protagonist of several Metroid games, films, manga series, and a comic book continuation of Captain N: The Game Master. She also appears in the film Metroid: The Sky Calls, portrayed by actresses Jessica Chobot and America Young. She has featured in several other game franchises,  including as a playable character in every installment of the Super Smash Bros. series.

In terms of gender representation in video games, she has received largely positive reviews. She is also recognized as one of the earliest female video game protagonists and has remained a popular and well-received character.

Character overview

Samus Aran is typically seen wearing the Power Suit, a powered exoskeleton which protects her from most dangers she encounters and can be enhanced by power-ups collected during gameplay. With the Power Suit's Arm Cannon, Samus can fire various energy beams, charge beams to shoot an extra-powerful blast, or launch a limited number of missiles. The Power Suit can be reconfigured into a small, spherical form called the Morph Ball, which allows her to roll through tight areas, such as tunnels, and use Bombs. It is also equipped with a Grapple Beam, which can be used to tether onto objects to cross large distances, such as chasms. Additionally, its visor can be used to scan objects to learn more about them, a feature that has been used since Metroid Prime. Aside from her Power Suit, Samus is also in possession of a Gunship, which is used in the games to save progress and restore her health and ammunition.

Instances of Samus appearing without the Power Suit occur mainly in cutscenes, such as post-game screenshots of her in more revealing clothing, which are unlocked depending on difficulty level, game completion, or play time. Metroid: Zero Mission introduced the Zero Suit, a form-fitting jumpsuit that she wears beneath the Power Suit. In Metroid: Other M, the Zero Suit (which here was given wedge heels despite a footnote in Zero Mission's concept art specifically stating not to) is capable of materializing the Power Suit from within itself.

The Metroid e-manga covers Samus's origins. She was born and raised on the Earth mining colony K-2L, and when she was a child, the planet was raided by Space Pirates led by Ridley in an attack that killed her parents and destroyed the colony. The orphaned Samus was then found by a bird-like alien race known as the Chozo, who brought her to their home planet, Zebes. To preserve her life and ensure that her status as the "Protector of the Galaxy" would come to pass, the Chozo infused their DNA within Samus, which granted her superhuman athleticism and a strong resistance to foreign environments. In addition, they trained her in combat by equipping her with one of their artifacts, the Power Suit. Upon completing her training and being granted the Power Suit by the Chozo, Samus then enlisted in the Galactic Federation at an unknown point after leaving the Chozo, but left over disagreements with her commanding officer, Adam Malkovich. Samus then started working as a freelance bounty hunter, and has since been called on by the Galactic Federation to execute missions "because of her superior skills and sense of justice". Most of her missions revolve around travelling the galaxy while eliminating unsavory elements, such as the enigmatic organisms known as the Metroids, which can drain life energy and are frequently sought after as biological weapons due to their extreme durability.

Concept and design
The style for the original Metroid game was designed to be a cross between the side-scrolling gameplay of the Super Mario series, the exploration and puzzle-solving aspects of The Legend of Zelda series, and inspiration from science fiction, particularly Ridley Scott's film Alien. The game's characters were conceived by Makoto Kano, while Hiroji Kiyotake designed the protagonist Samus Aran. Her signature ability to collapse into a ball to travel through tight areas was initially called the Maru Mari, meaning "round ball" in Japanese, and was rechristened as the Morph Ball in Super Metroid. The Morph Ball was conceived by the developers because it requires less effort to animate than "a cyborg crawling on all fours", and the producer for Metroid, Gunpei Yokoi, took advantage of this shortcut.

The series' co-creator Yoshio Sakamoto recalled: "We were partway through the development process when one of the staff members said 'Hey, wouldn't that be kind of cool if it turned out that this person inside the suit was a woman?'" The developers voted on the concept, and it passed. The game's instruction manual refers to Samus as if she were male to obscure her real sex until the surprise reveal at the end of the game. Sakamoto noted that during the course of the Metroid series, developers constantly try to express her femininity without sexually objectifying her. Samus's image was based on actress Sigourney Weaver in her role as Ellen Ripley from Aliens, and actress Kim Basinger from 9½ Weeks and My Stepmother Is an Alien. Sakamoto and Kiyotake said that the character's last name "Aran" was taken from Edson Arantes do Nascimento, the birth name of the famous football player Pelé. Despite Samus being identified as a bounty hunter, Nintendo later admitted that the occupation was chosen because they did not know what a bounty hunter was and simply liked the title, seeing her as an "altruistic" and "motherly" adventurer.

Generally, Samus is considered a silent protagonist. She did not speak in the original NES games, and in Super Metroid, she only spoke in the prologue. Samus broke her silence further in Fusion and Other M, although the latter received criticism due to poor character development and bad voice acting. The developers decided to revert to Samus' original concept in later games. In October 2021, producer Yoshio Sakamoto explained the reason why Samus barely speaks in Metroid Dread is "to convey the current situation of Samus or what Samus is thinking right now, this would be better conveyed to the player not through actual words or actual voice, but more with acting or visuals. I want the player to think, 'What is going on? What is Samus feeling right now?' That is why I decided to go this way for this game".

Appearances

In Metroid series

Samus debuted in Metroid (1986). The Galactic Federation sends Samus to track down the Space Pirates on their home planet of Zebes. Deep within their base, she battles Mother Brain, the organism that controls the base's defenses, and she escapes just as the base self-destructs.

In Metroid II: Return of Samus (1991) and its remake Metroid: Samus Returns (2017), the Galactic Federation commissions Samus to exterminate all Metroid creatures on the planet SR388.  She travels deep into the planet's caverns and after dispatching a Metroid Queen, Samus discovers a small Metroid hatchling, which imprints on her, thinking she is its mother. She spares its life and takes it back to her gunship.

In Super Metroid (1994), just after giving the hatchling to a Federation research station, Samus tracks the hatchling, which was stolen by Ridley, to a newly rebuilt Space Pirate base on Zebes. She travels deep underground, eventually finding the now-fully-grown Metroid, then battling a newly rebuilt and more powerful Mother Brain. The Metroid hatchling sacrifices itself to save Samus, and Samus in turn defeats Mother Brain and escapes as the entire planet is destroyed.

In Metroid Fusion (2002), Samus returns to SR388, where a parasitic organism infects and nearly kills her. Galactic Federation scientists surgically remove large portions of her corrupted Power Suit and inject her with the Metroid hatchling's DNA to save her. To prevent the now-dubbed X Parasites from spreading beyond SR388 and the space station orbiting above it, Samus sets the station to crash into the planet, during which she contends with the SA-X, an X Parasite that was born from her infected Power Suit pieces and possesses all of her abilities, while in Metroid Prime (2002) sub-series has its titular installment feature Samus traveling to the planet Tallon IV, which contains a Chozo colony in ruins and a Space Pirate base. There she learns of Phazon, a mysterious mutagen that can alter the genetic material of any organism. Samus is eventually able to access the source of the planet's Phazon contamination, a meteor impact crater, where she defeats the Phazon-infused creature Metroid Prime.

In Metroid Prime 2: Echoes (2004), Samus is sent to the planet Aether, a Phazon meteor-ravaged planet split into light and dark dimensions. There she battles the Ing, creatures that are able to possess other organisms, and Dark Samus, an evil doppelgänger of herself formed from the remains of her Phazon Suit and Metroid Prime itself.

In Metroid Prime 3: Corruption (2007), Dark Samus infects Samus with Phazon, which slowly corrupts her and further forces her to prevent it from spreading to other planets. By the end of the game, she renders all Phazon inert by destroying its original source, the planet Phaaze, and permanently destroys Dark Samus.

Metroid: Other M (2010) expands Samus's backstory and emotional scope, such as her brief motherly connection to the Metroid hatchling; the deep respect for her former commanding officer and father figure Adam Malkovich; her reignited feud with Mother Brain in the form of the android MB; and overcoming a posttraumatic episode upon once again encountering her arch-nemesis Ridley.

In Metroid Prime: Federation Force (2016), Samus is tasked by the Galactic Federation to investigate the Space Pirates' presence in the Bermuda System and provide intelligence to the Federation Force. However, after the Force abruptly loses contact with her, they later discover that she had been captured by the Pirates and is brainwashed into fighting them while in her Morph Ball form. After the Federation Force reluctantly defeat her, they proceed to help their fleet destroy the Pirates' massive battleship before narrowly escaping death with the help of a recovered Samus.

In Metroid Dread (2021), the Galactic Federation receives a video from an unknown source showing an X Parasite alive in the wild on Planet ZDR. To investigate, they send 7 EMMI (Extraplanetary Multiform Mobile Identifier) units. However, after losing contact with the units, they hire Samus once again as she is the only being in the universe immune to the X. Upon arriving on ZDR, Samus is attacked, left unconscious and stripped of her equipment by an unknown Chozo warrior. From there she travels through the planet to reach her ship on the surface, having to contend with the near invincible EMMI and other threats on the way.

In other media

Outside of Metroid series. Samus appears as a playable character throughout the Super Smash Bros. series, where she can use her array of weapons in combat against characters from other Nintendo franchises. Super Smash Bros. Brawl, Super Smash Bros. for Nintendo 3DS and Wii U and Super Smash Bros. Ultimate feature an alternate form of Samus called Zero Suit Samus, in which she wears her Zero Suit instead of her Power Suit, which in turn grants her a significantly different and unique move set.

Samus is featured in a series of comic books called Captain N: The Game Master, published by Valiant Comics in 1990, based on the animated series of the same name, though Samus never appears in the original cartoon version. In this non-canonical comic series, set before the events of Metroid, Samus is portrayed as brash, money-hungry, and fiercely independent, and title character Kevin Keene is depicted as her love interest. Comic book and manga adaptations of Metroid games where Samus also appeared were developed.

She also appears in the film Metroid: The Sky Calls, and was portrayed by actresses Jessica Chobot and America Young.

Samus makes cameo appearances in the games Galactic Pinball (1995), Super Mario RPG (1996), Kirby Super Star (1996), and Kirby's Dream Land 3 (1997), and a non-playable appearance in Dead or Alive: Dimensions by Metroid: Other M co-developers Team Ninja.

Various figures based on the character were produced by various manufacturers. Samus is one of the twelve original amiibo in November 2014.

Reception and legacy
As a woman in a male-dominated role, Samus has been widely considered a breakthrough for female characters in video games, and is one of the most beloved video game characters of all time. Samus is one of the first major female protagonists in a video game, predated by one year by Toby Masuyo ("Kissy") from Namco's Alien Sector (Baraduke). In 2011, readers of Guinness World Records Gamer's Edition voted Samus at 14th of the top video game characters of all time. 2013's Guinness World Records Gamer's Edition declared Samus as "the first playable human female character in a mainstream videogame", and as being "enduringly" popular, noting that sales of the Metroid series has exceeded 17.44 million copies as of September 2012. In 2009, GameDaily called Samus the video game industry's "first dominant female, a femme de force that didn't rely on a man to save her", also ranking her number one on a list of the top Nintendo characters of all time. In 2010, James Hawkins of Joystick Division ranked her as number one top "badass lady" in video games, adding that she "made every other character on this list possible", while UGO.com ranked her as 20th in a list of top heroes of all-time. In 2011, Nintendo Power listed Samus as their third-favorite hero, citing her bravery in the face of dangerous situations, while UGO.com included her on the list of video game characters who need their own movies. That same year, Empire ranked her as the 26th-greatest video game character, adding, "whether you see her as a breakthrough for feminism or just another faceless sci-fi warrior, 1986's unexpected reveal that showed women could be more in gaming lore than eye candy for geeky boys was a refreshing and unforgettable moment". In 2012, GamesRadar ranked her as the "fifth-most memorable, influential, and badass" protagonist in video games: "Whether she's 2D or 3D, in a sidescroller or FPS, her strength and determination always shine through, allowing her the power to defeat floating aliens and space pirates alike". In 2013, Complex ranked her as the "11th-most badass" video game character of all time, as well as the greatest heroine in video game history, and the third-greatest soldier in video games.

The unveiling of Samus in Metroid, which UGO.com called the original "jaw-dropping moment" in gaming, was named as the greatest twist in video games by Game Informer in 2007 and as the greatest moment in Nintendo's history by GameDaily in 2008. The Irish Times found it refreshing to learn that the series' protagonist, who is "well disguised under the suit of heavy armour", is female, but Rupert Goodwins of The Independent wrote that the "Transformer-like suit she wears could just as easily contain a large centipede; it's hardly a breakthrough for feminism". According to the 2007 book Gaming Lives in the Twenty-First Century: Literate Connections, Samus was perhaps the most nonsexualized female video game character ever, a belief shared by Steve Rabin in Introduction to Game Development, which considered Samus as one of Nintendo's most popular video game mascots. 1UP.com described Samus in the Captain N comics as "rambunctious, reckless, and gets into fighting contests with Lana over Kevin's affections, which makes for some of the most entertaining situations in the series", before adding that "not to say that the deadly quiet, contemplative Samus who fights for truth and justice in the more recent Metroid games isn't awesome, but there's something compelling about a Samus who's greedy and conniving – and is proud to admit it". In 2002, Justin Hoeger of The Sacramento Bee opined that "unlike most other female video game characters, Samus isn't some husky-voiced bimbo in tight leather included only for sex appeal. Samus is tough, silent, heavily armed and spends most of her time in a bulky suit of high-tech Power Armor". That same year, however, an article in the Toronto Star retorted that the "sexual politics" surrounding Samus and the Metroid series needed to stop, arguing that the original "big crazy shock to the gaming public" was "some seriously misspent energy" as she "is not a woman for the benefit of the sweaty/excited crowd, and neither is she a standard-bearer nor a courageous leader in the struggle for video game civil rights. She is a supremely talented action figure, and in the closeups on her helmet you can kind of see that she wears mascara, but that is all". UGO.com included Samus's one-piece bathing swimsuit on the list of the best alternate costumes and IGN chose "Dude (Looks Like a Lady)" by Aerosmith as Samus's theme song because she "spends her time running around in a manly battle suit blasting first and taking names later". Featuring her in their 2004 list of "top ten forces of good" (one section on their list of top 50 "retro" game characters), Retro Gamer opined she has remained "a distinct female character, not relying on cheap thrills to capture the attention of gamers, which is more than can be said for some".

Nevertheless, much of Samus's media reception came from her sex appeal. GameTrailers named Samus number one on a 2006 list of the top ten women of gaming, and number three among top ten "gamer babes" in 2007. GameDaily ranked Samus seventh on a list of the top "hottest game babes", describing her as "a refreshing change of pace, a tough, no-nonsense warrior that isn't afraid to remove her famous orange and yellow power suit and let her hair down, especially to reveal her skin-tight clothing". She was further listed on GameDaily's list of "hottest" blondes in video games, described as both one of Nintendo's most famous protagonists as well as a "curvaceous, drop-dead-gorgeous woman", and used to illustrate the "smart and sexy heroine" concept on their list of top video game archetypes. Game Informer listed her as number one on their list of the top ten "dorks" of 2010, citing her "lame backstory" in Other M. In 2008, Spike placed Samus on the top of their list of "video game vixen" as "a foxy broad that conceals her curves inside a weapon of death and destruction", while MSN India listed her as one of "the best-looking game characters with perfect figures". In 2009, UGO.com ranked Samus as 11th on a list of the top "girls of gaming" and as the "eighth-hottest sci-fi girl", also including her in the 2011 list of 50 video game "hotties". Samus's Zero Suit was ranked by ScrewAttack as fourth on their 2010 list of the top 10 sexiest outfits in games on GameTrailers, while Sarah Warn of AfterEllen ranked Samus as the "tenth-hottest" female video game character. In 2011, GameFront featured her twice on the list of the "best boobs in video game history", at 40th spot for her reveal in the original game and at sixth place for her modern appearance in "a ridiculously form-fitting jumpsuit". That same year, Lisa Foiles of The Escapist ranked the Zero Suit Samus as number one "hottest blonde chick" in video games. In 2012, Complex ranked her as the "24th-hottest" video game character, also ranking her as the fourth-top "hot female killer" from video games, while Nixie Pixel from Revision3 placed Samus on top of her sexiest "game girls" list. Thanh Niên ranked her as the tenth-most sexy female character in 2015, in particular for her Zero Suit. In 2021, Chris Morgan for Yardbarker described Samus as one of "the most memorable characters from old school Nintendo games". In 2021, HobbyConsolas also included Samus on their "The 30 best heroes of the last 30 years", while Rachel Weber of GamesRadar ranked Samus as 21st of their "50 iconic video game characters".

Samus has been well received by the video game community. In 2001, IGN remarked that Samus has a cult following greater than most other female video game characters. She was chosen by the users of IGN as the most requested character who should have her own movie franchise by the website's users, the staff remarking that her tragic past makes her a perfect candidate for a movie, especially the loss of both her parents to the Space Pirates. Among their list of voted characters, IGN considered Samus to be the video game character that "could lead the pack of video game adaptations that actually manage to live up to the source material". In 2009, GameSpot featured her in their poll "All-Time Greatest Game Hero", in which she lost to Mario in the semi-finals. Paul O'Connor, the lead game designer for Sammy Studios and a fan of the Metroid series, remarked that players empathize and identify with Samus because she is often rewarded for indulging in her curiosity. The book Videogames and Art noted that in the original Metroid the player is not briefed on Samus's past or future; the only interaction that they have with the character is by being her through gameplay, while bits of information can be gleaned from the handbook and through concept art, adding, "Samus is very rare for the character intimacy gained solely through game play and for her stasis and then drastic change", referring to the revelation that she is a woman. Former mixed martial artist and actress Ronda Rousey told GameSpot in a 2016 interview that she "always wanted to be Samus" if a live-action Metroid film is made. Her controversial portrayal in Metroid: Other M received mixed reactions. Unlike other Metroid games, where Samus took full advantage of weapons and abilities available, she deactivated most of them until Commander Adam Malkovich authorized their use. G4 TV considered the portrayal of Samus as "sexist", stating that as she "cannot possibly wield the amount of power she possesses unless directed to by a man" and that her anxiety attack cannot be reconciled with her previous portrayals. According to GamePro, though Other Ms story and Samus's monologues did not compel them, "it helped contextualize her entire existence" which developed the character to "an actual human being who's using the vastness of space to try and put some distance between herself and the past". 1UP.coms Justin Hayward found the portrayal "lifeless and boring" and "nonsensical". GamesRadar wrote that Other M painted Samus, widely considered a strong female lead character, as "an unsure, insecure woman who desperately wants the approval of her former [male] commanding officer". The A.V. Club echoed the misgivings about her immaturity, petulant behavior, and misguided loyalty. In Metroid Dread, several people noted that Samus never talks as a protagonist. Alex Donaldson of VG247 has claimed that the game proves that Samus is cooler than Master Chief. However, Ian Walker of Kotaku criticized and said that "Samus doesn't need to be an emotionless robot to be badass".

In his review of Super Smash Bros., GameSpots Jeff Gerstmann called Samus one of the characters that made Nintendo "what it is today". Samus was ranked fifth on GameDailys 2009 list of top characters in the Smash Bros. series, while IGN ranked her as the third-best character for Super Smash Bros. Jeremy Parish of Polygon ranked 73 fighters from Super Smash Bros. Ultimate "from garbage to glorious", placing Samus as 6th and praised the character by calling her as still by far "the toughest lady in Nintendo's stable of characters", while Gavin Jasper of Den of Geek ranked Samus as 5th of Super Smash Bros. Ultimate characters, praising its inclusion in the roster, particularly her armor and abilities.

See also

Gender representation in video games
List of female action heroes and villains
Women warriors in literature and culture

Further reading

Notes

References

External links
 

Adoptee characters in video games
Characters designed by Hiroji Kiyotake
Extraterrestrial–human hybrids in video games
Extraterrestrial superheroes
Fictional bodyguards in video games
Fictional bounty hunters
Fictional characters with post-traumatic stress disorder
Fictional explorers in video games
Fictional government agents
Fictional mercenaries in video games
Fictional space pilots
Fictional whip users
First-person shooter characters
Intelligent Systems characters
Metroid characters
Nintendo protagonists
Orphan characters in video games
Super Smash Bros. fighters
Video game characters introduced in 1986
Video game mascots
Video game superheroes
Woman soldier and warrior characters in video games
Female characters in video games
Spike Video Game Award winners